KRI Oswald Siahaan (354) is an  operated by the Indonesian Navy. Prior to her service in the Indonesian Navy, she served in the Royal Netherlands Navy as  HNLMS Van Nes (F805).

Design and construction
In the early 1960s, the Royal Netherlands Navy had an urgent requirement to replace its s, obsolete ex-American escorts built during the Second World War. To meet this requirement, it chose to build a modified version of the British  as its , using broadly the same armament as the original design, but where possible, substituting Dutch electronics and radars.

Displacement was  standard and  full load.

A twin 4.5-inch (113 mm) Mark 6 gun mount was fitted forward. Anti-aircraft defence was provided by two quadruple Sea Cat surface-to-air missile launchers on the hangar roof. A Limbo anti-submarine mortar was fitted aft to provide a short-range anti-submarine capability, while a hangar and  helicopter deck allowed a single Westland Wasp helicopter to be operated, for longer range anti-submarine and anti-surface operations.

As built, Van Nes was fitted with a Signaal LW-03 long range air search radar on the ship's mainmast, with a DA02 medium range air/surface surveillance radar carried on the ship's foremast. M44 and M45 fire control radars were provided for the Seacat missiles and ships guns respectively. The ship had a sonar suite of Type 170B attack sonar and Type 162 bottom search sonar. The ship had a crew of 251, later reduced to 180.

Modifications

All six Van Speijks were modernised in the 1970s, using many of the systems used by the new s. The 4.5-inch gun was replaced by a single OTO Melara 76 mm and launchers for up to eight Harpoon anti-ship missiles fitted (although only two were normally carried). The hangar and flight deck were enlarged, allowing a Westland Lynx helicopter to be carried, while the Limbo mortar was removed, with a pair of triple Mk 32 torpedo launchers providing close-in anti-submarine armament. A Signaal DA03 radar replaced the DA02 radar and an American EDO Corporation CWE-610 sonar replaced the original British sonar. Van Nes was modernised at the Den Helder naval dockyard between 31 March 1978 and 28 November 1980.

In Indonesian service, the ship was refitted several times. The two quad Sea Cat short-range SAM were replaced by two twin Simbad launchers for Mistral short-range SAM. She is also fitted with two single 12.7 mm DShK heavy machine guns. Oswald Siahaan was then modernized by PT Mulia and PT PAL, which was completed in 2006. The ship's was re-engined with two  SEMT Pielstick 12 PA6B diesel engines. As the Indonesian Navy retired Harpoon missile from its stockpiles, Oswald Siahaan was rearmed with Russian Yakhont missiles.

Service history
The ship was previously operated by the Royal Netherlands Navy as the Van Speijk-class frigate HNLMS Van Nes (F805). Van Nes was laid down on 25 July 1963, launched on 26 March 1966, commissioned on 9 August 1966 and decommissioned in February 1987. On 11 February 1986, Indonesia and the Netherlands signed an agreement for transfer of two Van Speijk class with option on two more ships. The ship was transferred to Indonesia on 31 October 1988 where it received its current name.

In May 2016, Oswald Siahaan seized a Chinese trawler, the Gui Bei Yu (27088), in the waters of Natuna Islands, firing shots at the trawler and blocking an attempt by a Chinese coast guard ship to rescue the fishing ship - which was taken under Indonesian custody.

References

Bibliography

 

Van Speijk-class frigates
1966 ships
Ships built in the Netherlands